Mala Krsna is a village located in the city of Smederevo, Serbia. As of 2011 census, it has a population of 1,552 inhabitants.

It is said to be the second-largest railroad junction in Serbia. It is known by Najdan's circles.

The village streets are marked by white circles that people believe cure many ailments.

External links 
 The Magic Circles of Najdan:The Stand Global

References

Populated places in Podunavlje District